Live and Loud!! and Live and Rockin' are series of live albums released by the British label Link Records. The label started releasing live albums by punk bands under the name Live and Loud!! in 1987 and released them through 1992. In 1989, the label started releasing live albums by rockabilly/psychobilly bands under the name Live and Rockin', and released them through 1990. Prior to 1989, the albums were exclusively released on vinyl. Many were released on CD later on, with some being released on vinyl and CD simultaneously.

Releases

References
 
 

Live album series